Simianus is a genus of beetles in the family Callirhipidae. It was described by Blanchard in 1853.

Species
 Simianus angustatus Pic, 1929
 Simianus apicalis Pic, 1923
 Simianus apicalis apicalis Pic, 1923
 Simianus apicalis lateapicalis Pic, 1928
 Simianus atrimembris Pic, 1950
 Simianus basalis (van Emden, 1924)
 Simianus bicolor (Fairmaire, 1893)
 Simianus bicoloripes Pic, 1922
 Simianus bituberculatus (Schultze, 1915)
 Simianus bituberculatus bituberculatus (Schultze, 1915)
 Simianus bituberculatus dilatatus (van Emden, 1932)
 Simianus confusus (van Emden, 1932)
 Simianus croceosellatus (Fairmaire, 1887)
 Simianus cyaneicollis (Waterhouse, 1877)
 Simianus discoidalis Pic, 1923
 Simianus diversicornis Pic, 1925
 Simianus globicollis (van Emden, 1924)
 Simianus inapicalis Pic, 1925
 Simianus incisus (van Emden, 1924)
 Simianus javanus Pic, 1929
 Simianus laetus (Waterhouse, 1877)
 Simianus latepunctatus (Pic, 1943)
 Simianus maculaticeps (Pic, 1921)
 Simianus maculaticeps bilineatus Pic, 1938
 Simianus maculaticeps maculaticeps (Pic, 1921)
 Simianus malaccanus (Pic, 1916)
 Simianus melanocephalus (van Emden, 1924)
 Simianus mesomelaenus (Fairmaire, 1887)
 Simianus nigripennis (van Emden, 1932)
 Simianus nigriventralis (Schultze, 1915)
 Simianus niponicus (Lewis, 1895)
 Simianus obscurus (van Emden, 1924)
 Simianus obscurus obscurus (van Emden, 1924)
 Simianus obscurus sikkimensis (van Emden, 1932)
 Simianus oshimanus (Nakane, 1973)
 Simianus palawanicus (van Emden, 1932)
 Simianus pascoei (Waterhouse, 1895)
 Simianus pasteuri Pic, 1928
 Simianus reductus Pic, 1925
 Simianus ruber (Pic, 1929)
 Simianus rubricollis (Pic, 1916)
 Simianus separatus (Gemminger, 1869)
 Simianus terminatus Fairmaire, 1887
 Simianus thoracicus (van Emden, 1924)
 Simianus ustus (Fairmaire, 1887)

References

Callirhipidae
Elateriformia genera